The Main Drama Theatre of Turkmenistan is a major theatre in Ashgabat, Turkmenistan, designed and built by the French construction company Bouygues. Its repertoire is mainly based on the plays of classical and modern Turkmen playwrights, presented in the Turkmen language. The theatre troupe consists of folk and popular artists of Turkmenistan. It is considered the main theater in the country.

The theatre opened in October 2005, and was initially named in honor of then-President of Turkmenistan Saparmurat Niyazov., officially called Main Drama Theatre after Saparmurat Turkmenbashi the Great.

References

Links 
 Theatres and Cinema Centers

Ashgabat
Opera houses in Turkmenistan
Theatres in Ashgabat
Theatres completed in 2005
2005 establishments in Turkmenistan